Le Plessis-Robinson is a commune in the southwestern suburbs of Paris, France. , it has 29,100 inhabitants.

History
Plessis was first mentioned in 839 as Plessiacus apud Castanetum, meaning plessis near Castanetum. A plessis was a village surrounded by a fence made of branches. In 1112 the village church was founded, of which the romanesque tower still survives as the oldest monument of Le Plessis. At the end of the 12th the village was renamed Le Plessis-Raoul, after the local lord Raoul, chamberlain of king Philip II of France. In 1407 it came into the hands of Jean Piquet de La Haye, who built a castle in the village, now called Le Plessis-Piquet. In 1614 a monastery of the Congregation of the Feuillants was built in the village. In 1682 Jean-Baptiste Colbert, Minister of Finances under Louis XIV had a pond dug which fed the fountains of the nearby Château de Sceaux.  Pierre de Montesquiou d'Artagnan purchased the estate in 1699, and expanded the gardens. In 1790, as a result of the French Revolution, Antoine Moullé was elected the first mayor of Le Plessis. The commune was renamed Le Plessis-Liberté. The monastery was nationalised and demolished.

The commune was renamed back to Le Plessis-Piquet in 1801. In 1848, a guinguette (cabaret) was established in the area as a suite of interconnected tree houses. It was named Le grand Robinson after the tree house described in Swiss Family Robinson, a novel itself named after Robinson Crusoe. Several other popular establishments arose in the area and remained popular until the 1960s. In 1909, the commune of Le Plessis-Piquet was officially renamed Le Plessis-Robinson, after Le grand Robinson. In 1854, Louis Hachette bought the castle and the grounds. He later became the mayor of Le Plessis-Piquet and a city councillor. The village and the castle were ruined in the Franco-Prussian War, but the castle was rebuilt by the Hachette family.

Population

New Urbanism 

Today Le Plessis-Robinson is considered as the most significant project of New Urbanism in France. Philippe Pemezec, mayor between 1989 and 2018, started a project to reshape the city, in collaboration with the architects Marc & Nada Breitman, winners of the 2018 Driehaus Prize and part of the New Classical movement.

Transport
Le Plessis-Robinson is not served by the Paris Métro, RER, or the suburban rail network. The closest station to Le Plessis-Robinson is Robinson station on Paris RER line B. This station is located in the neighboring commune of Sceaux,  from the town center of Le Plessis-Robinson.

Education
Primary schools include two groups of nurseries and preschools, five standalone nurseries/preschools (maternelles), four standalone elementaries, and Ecole Raymond Aumont.

Secondary schools:
 Two junior high schools: Collège Claude Nicolas Ledoux and Collège Romain Rolland
 One senior high school: Lycée Montesquieu

Sites of interest
Château park

Twin towns

Le Plessis-Robinson is twinned with the following towns:
 Woking, United Kingdom
 Arabkir, Yerevan, Armenia

See also
Communes of the Hauts-de-Seine department

References

External links

Le Plessis-Robinson City Hall

Communes of Hauts-de-Seine
New Urbanism communities
New Classical architecture